Limen is a word of equivocal semantics written in the Latin alphabet, and used in many different modern languages, including English. It generally, but not necessarily, represents the Latin word limen, plural limina, “threshold,” or is a transliteration into the Latin alphabet of the ancient Greek word, λιμήν, “harbor, refuge, creek.” Some specific uses are:

Anthropology
 Limen, a Chinese word for “gateway of the principle” used in Zailiism

Science
 Limen, a threshold of a physiological or psychological response
 Limen insulae, the junction point between anterior and posterior stem of the sylvian fissure in the brain
 Limen nasi, a mucous ridge between the nasal vestibule and the rest of nasal cavity
 Difference limen, a Just-noticeable difference in experimental psychology
 Limenavis, “threshold bird” a fossil bird genus

Geography
 Borboros Limen, ancient name of Giannitsa, Greece
 Dioecesis Iuen-limensis, the Roman Catholic Diocese of Yuanling
 Elaias Limen, an ancient harbor town at the mouth of the Acheron river of Epirus
 Karon Limen, ancient name for Shabla, a city on the Black Sea
 Leucus Limen, ancient name for Al-Qusayr, Egypt
 limen Trichonis, ancient name for Lake Trichonida, the largest natural lake in Greece
 Limenwara, early administrative subdivision of the Kingdom of Kent
 Pelodes Limen, unknown harbor of an unknown stream, Pelodes, mentioned by Strabo
 Symbolon Limen, ancient name for Dolichenus in Roman Crimea

Other
 limen sali, an unknown phrase in the ancient Carmen Arvale
 Limen (ballet), a work of Wayne McGregor
 limen, theoretical chimera of a lime and a lemon

See also
 Liminal (disambiguation)